Rhabdochaeta spinosa is a species of tephritid or fruit flies in the genus Rhabdochaeta of the family Tephritidae.

Distribution
Seychelles.

References

Tephritinae
Insects described in 1914
Diptera of Asia